Mandjou Keita (born 28 November 1979) is a Guinean international footballer who plays as an attacking midfielder or forward.

Career

Club
Keita began his professional career in Malaysia with Perak, making his debut on 12 September 2004 against PKNS FC. He impressed Perak FA's fans so much that he was carried off the pitch by two jubilant fans after the match  He went on to play a key role in Perak FA's Malaysian FA Cup winning team, which led to his contract being renewed for the 2005 season.

Keita won the Golden Boot award for the 2006 season, scoring 17 goals. He was one of the three nominees for the Favourite Import Player award in the inaugural Malaysian football awards but he did not win.

He was linked with a move away from the club to Indonesian team Persija Jakarta in 2007, but did not let those rumours affect his on-pitch performance, and ended up Perak's top scorer once again for the 2006/2007 season.

Keita was released from his contract at the end of the 2007 season due to "family issues", and after attending trials with French side FC Lorient. signed with Bruneian side Brunei DPMM FC, and played one season for them in the Singaporean S. League.

In January 2009, Keita signed with Portland Timbers in the USL First Division. Keita's preferred playing position is as a striker, but he can also operate in midfield behind the front two.

Following the 2009 USL-1 season, Portland loaned Keita to Salgaocar S.C. of the Indian I-League. Keita returned to Portland in April, 2010.

After returning to the Timbers from loan, Keita failed to find his form in the 2010 season. Keita appeared in 10 league games and scored just one goal. On 1 September, Keita was transferred to Indian club Pune.

Pune FC
On 3 December 2010 Keita started his I-League journey with Pune FC first game of the season, a tie 1-1 against Mohun Bagan. On 30 January 2011 Keita scored his first hat-trick for the club against JCT Mills in the I-League.

Kelantan FA
After two season with Pune FC, Keita returned to Malaysia to join Malaysian club Kelantan FA as the fourth import player for the 2012 AFC Cup competition. However, he was not eligible to play in the AFC Cup because of problems with regard to his International Transfer Certificates (ITC).

International career
Keita was a member and captain of the Guinea U-23 national team.

Honors

Perak
FA Cup Malaysia (1): 2004

Portland Timbers
USL First Division Commissioner's Cup (1): 2009

Individual
Super League Malaysia Golden Boot (2): 2005-06, 2006-07
USL First Division All-League First Team (1): 2009

References

External links
 Portland Timbers bio
 Profile at www.liberiansoccer.com
 Perak FA bio

1979 births
Living people
Guinean footballers
Liberian footballers
Guinean expatriate sportspeople in Malaysia
Liberian expatriate sportspeople in Malaysia
Expatriate footballers in Malaysia
Portland Timbers (2001–2010) players
Salgaocar FC players
USL First Division players
USSF Division 2 Professional League players
Expatriate footballers in Brunei
Expatriate soccer players in the United States
Expatriate footballers in India
Guinean expatriate footballers
Liberian expatriate footballers
Liberian expatriate sportspeople in India
People from Nzérékoré
Pune FC players
Perak F.C. players
I-League players
DPMM FC players
Kelantan FA players
Association football forwards